Francisco de Ulloa (died 1540) was a Spanish explorer who explored the west coast of present-day Mexico and the Baja California Peninsula under the commission of Hernán Cortés. Ulloa's voyage was among the first to disprove the cartographic misconception of the existence of the Island of California.

Exploring career
It is not known whether Ulloa accompanied Cortés on his first expedition to the New Spain. By the account of historian Bernal Díaz del Castillo, he came to Mexico later while transporting letters to Cortés from his wife. According to some early historians, Ulloa was influential in helping subdue the Aztec capital Tenochtitlan by naval power.

In 1539, at the private expense of Cortés, he embarked on an expedition in three small vessels, sailing north from Acapulco to explore the Pacific Coast, and to seek a sea route through the North American continent that supposedly led to the Gulf of St. Lawrence, proving the existence of a northern passage.  The expedition left on July 8 sailing northwards along the coast and reaching the Gulf of California six weeks later. Ulloa named it the "Sea of Cortés" in honor of his patron. When one of his ships was lost in a storm Ulloa paused to repair the other two ships, and then resumed his voyage on September 12, eventually reaching the head of the Gulf.

Unable to find the through-continent route, Ulloa turned south and sailed along the eastern coast of the Baja California Peninsula, landing at the Bay of La Paz. After taking on supplies of wood and water Ulloa rounded the tip of the peninsula with great difficulty and sailed northward along the western shore in the Pacific Ocean.

The voyage eventually reached 28 degrees north near the Isla de Cedros. The fierce winds and high seas he encountered eventually stalled his progress. Accounts differ if Ulloa continued northward or if he turned around to return to New Spain. A personal letter to Cortes on April 5 seemed to indicate that he intended to continue northward, at which point his ship was lost. However, no records note the loss of his voyage, and the fact that later maps from the voyage of Juan Rodríguez Cabrillo included detail of this part of the peninsula indicate that Ulloa returned to New Spain and was able to confer with cartographers.

Díaz del Castillo maintains that Ulloa was able to return to port, and was stabbed to death by a soldier from his crew in 1540. However, in 1543, Cortes indicated that he believed Ulloa was alive as part of a legal investigation as to the whereabouts of the daughter of one of his former pilots, stating that "Ulloa had carried her off and could give the information better than he," casting further doubt on Ulloa's ultimate fate.

Although his discoveries showed that Baja California is a peninsula, legends and maps depicting California as an island persisted intermittently into the 18th century, indicating that Ulloa was unable to convince explorers or cartographers of his discovery.

References

Further reading

External links
Catholic Encyclopedia Francisco de Ulloa
AmericanJourneys.org  Francisco de Ulloa

1540 deaths
16th-century Mexican people
History of Baja California
History of the Gulf of California
Spanish explorers of North America
Spanish explorers of the Pacific
16th-century Spanish people
1540 in New Spain
Year of birth unknown
Explorers of Mexico
Etymology of California